Jamie McGowan (born 5 December 1970 in Morecambe, Lancashire) is an English former professional footballer who played as a defender; he spent all of his professional career in the Scottish leagues, with clubs including Dundee, Falkirk, Motherwell and St Mirren.

Notes

External links

1970 births
Living people
Sportspeople from Morecambe
Association football defenders
English footballers
Dundee F.C. players
Falkirk F.C. players
Motherwell F.C. players
St Mirren F.C. players
Alloa Athletic F.C. players
Albion Rovers F.C. players
East Fife F.C. players
Scottish Football League players
Scottish Premier League players